Mold paintings or molded paintings are works of art, created on traditional painting surfaces such as impregnated wall, wood and canvas, but instead of the traditional painting techniques, mold (fungus) is used to create the visual form. The works are created in a special environmental chamber where the specific conditions for mold formation and growth are maintained, such as the correct temperature, humidity and air intake.
Works of art created using this nontraditional painting technique were first exhibited in the Stale Art, Hibernation exhibition in Skopje, Macedonia, 2013.

See also 
Fungi in art

References

External links
Vecer.com.mk
Radiomof.mk
Cooltura.mk

Painting techniques